László Vajda may refer to:

Ladislao Vajda, Hungarian director
Ladislaus Vajda, Hungarian screenwriter
László Vajda (figure skater), Hungarian figure skater